Analgidae is a family of mites belonging to the order Sarcoptiformes.

Genera

Genera:
 Analges Nitzsch, 1818
 Ancyralges Gaud, 1966
 Anhemialges Gaud & Mouchet, 1959

References

Sarcoptiformes